Ajoypur is a village located in Suri I Block in the Birbhum district in the state of West Bengal, India.

References 

Villages in Birbhum district